A proboscis is an elongated appendage from the head of an animal, either a vertebrate or an invertebrate. In invertebrates, the term usually refers to tubular mouthparts used for feeding and sucking. In vertebrates, a proboscis is an elongated nose or snout.

Etymology
First attested in English in 1609 from Latin , the latinisation of the Ancient Greek , which comes from  'forth, forward, before' + , 'to feed, to nourish'.

Invertebrates
The most common usage is to refer to the tubular feeding and sucking organ of certain invertebrates such as insects (e.g., moths, butterflies, and mosquitoes), worms (including Acanthocephala, proboscis worms) and gastropod molluscs.

Acanthocephala

The Acanthocephala  or thorny-headed worms, or spiny-headed worms are characterized by the presence of an eversible proboscis, armed with spines, which it uses to pierce and hold the gut wall of its host.

Lepidoptera mouth parts
The mouth parts of Lepidoptera mainly consist of the sucking kind; this part is known as the proboscis or 'haustellum'. The proboscis consists of two tubes held together by hooks and separable for cleaning. The proboscis contains muscles for operating. Each tube is inwardly concave, thus forming a central tube up which moisture is sucked. Suction takes place due to the contraction and expansion of a sac in the head. A specific example of the proboscis being used for feeding is in the species Deilephila elpenor. In this species, the moth hovers in front of the flower and extends its long proboscis to attain its food.

A few Lepidoptera species lack mouth parts and therefore do not feed in the imago.  Others, such as the family Micropterigidae, have mouth parts of the chewing kind.

The study of insect mouthparts was helpful for the understanding of the functional mechanism of the proboscis of butterflies (Lepidoptera) to elucidate the evolution of new form-function. The study of the proboscis of butterflies revealed surprising examples of adaptations to different kinds of fluid food, including nectar, plant sap, tree sap, dung and of adaptations to the use of pollen as complementary food in Heliconius butterflies. An extremely long proboscis appears within different groups of flower-visiting insects, but is relatively rare.

Gastropods

Vertebrates
The elephant's trunk and the tapir's elongated nose are called "proboscis", as is the snout of the male elephant seal.

The proboscis monkey is named for its enormous nose.

An abnormal facial appendage that sometimes accompanies ocular and nasal abnormalities in humans is also called a proboscis.

Notable mammals with some form of proboscis are:
 Aardvark
 Anteater
 Members of the elephant family (see elephant trunk)
 Elephant shrews
 Hispaniolan solenodon
 Echidna
 Elephant seal
 Leptictidium (extinct)
 Moeritherium (extinct)
 Numbat
 Proboscis monkey
 Saiga antelope
 Members of the Tapir family

References

Animal anatomy